Kenilworth is a borough in Union County, in the U.S. state of New Jersey. As of the 2020 United States census, the borough's population was 8,427, an increase of 513 (+6.5%) from the 2010 census count of 7,914, which in turn reflected an increase of 239 (+3.1%) from the 7,675 counted in the 2000 census.

Kenilworth was incorporated as a borough by an act of the New Jersey Legislature on May 13, 1907, from portions of Cranford and Union Township, based on the results of a referendum held on June 18, 1907.

History

In the late 1890s, the New Orange Industrial Association purchased land in Cranford and Union that was subdivided into building lots. The firm brought in several large industries and lured Upsala College from Brooklyn with an offer of cash and free land for its campus.

Because New Orange was often confused with one of The Oranges in Essex County, the name "Kenilworth" was chosen when the borough was incorporated in 1907. The name Kenilworth came from a literary society (The Kenilworth Club) which the businessmen belonged to. The Kenilworth Club was named in honor of the novel Kenilworth written in 1821 by Sir Walter Scott. The novel refers to England's Kenilworth Castle located in Kenilworth, England.

Geography
According to the United States Census Bureau, the borough had a total area of 2.15 square miles (5.57 km2), including 2.15 square miles (5.56 km2) of land and <0.01 square miles (0.01 km2) of water (0.19%).

The upper reaches of Rahway River Parkway along tributaries of the Rahway River run through the borough.

The borough is bordered to the north and east by Union Township, to the southeast by Roselle Park, to the southwest by Cranford, and to the northwest by Springfield Township.

Parks and recreation
Lenape Park is a  wildlife reserve and park that is part of the Rahway River Parkway in Union County. The park also includes portions of Cranford, Springfield and Westfield. An approximately 4.5-mile off-road paved pedestrian path stretches eastbound from Mountainside Police Headquarters in Mountainside,  through Echo Lake Park in Westfield, Lenape Park in Westfield and Cranford, Black Brook Park in Kenilworth, and ending near 505 North Michigan Avenue in Kenilworth.

Kenilworth RVRR rail trail

 
Area residents have proposed a 7.3-mile pedestrian linear park along the "main line" of the abandoned Rahway Valley Railroad that would run through Kenilworth. The rail trail would run eastbound from Overlook Medical Center on the edge of downtown Summit and head south through  Springfield,  Union, over Route 22 to Kenilworth. In Kenilworth, it would pass between Party City and Burger King on Route 22, run behind Retro Fitness, running south past the Galloping Hill Golf Course and ACME Markets, and end at the southwest edge of Roselle Park at the Cranford border.

A northern portion of the rail trail on the RVRR main line is under construction as the Summit Park Line, with a footbridge over Morris Avenue installed in October 2022. In parallel, advocates have been pushing for immediate development of the portion of the RVRR Main Line south of Route 22, running past the Galloping Hill Golf Course through Kenilworth and Roselle Park. The New Jersey Department of Transportation, which owns the railbed, has been working to clear it in anticipation of possible future trail use for pedestrians and cyclists.

Demographics

2010 census

The Census Bureau's 2006–2010 American Community Survey showed that (in 2010 inflation-adjusted dollars) median household income was $76,500 (with a margin of error of +/− $8,607) and the median family income was $84,097 (+/− $6,220). Males had a median income of $58,327 (+/− $7,147) versus $42,589 (+/− $5,730) for females. The per capita income for the borough was $31,959 (+/− $2,853). About 4.0% of families and 5.7% of the population were below the poverty line, including 11.6% of those under age 18 and 4.5% of those age 65 or over.

2000 census
As of the 2000 United States census there were 7,675 people, 2,854 households, and 2,117 families residing in the borough. The population density was 3,584.9 people per square mile (1,384.7/km2). There were 2,926 housing units at an average density of 1,366.7 per square mile (527.9/km2). The racial makeup of the borough was 92.30% White, 2.30% African American, 0.25% Native American, 2.88% Asian, 1.80% from other races, and 1.38% from two or more races. Hispanic or Latino residents of any race were 8.64% of the population.

There were 2,854 households, out of which 28.6% had children under the age of 18 living with them, 58.4% were married couples living together, 11.9% had a female householder with no husband present, and 25.8% were non-families. 21.4% of all households were made up of individuals, and 11.0% had someone living alone who was 65 years of age or older. The average household size was 2.69 and the average family size was 3.15.

In the borough the population was spread out, with 20.8% under the age of 18, 6.9% from 18 to 24, 30.8% from 25 to 44, 23.3% from 45 to 64, and 18.2% who were 65 years of age or older. The median age was 40 years. For every 100 females, there were 94.2 males. For every 100 females age 18 and over, there were 90.7 males.

The median income for a household in the borough was $59,929, and the median income for a family was $66,500. Males had a median income of $40,808 versus $34,698 for females. The per capita income for the borough was $24,343. About 1.9% of families and 2.0% of the population were below the poverty line, including 2.2% of those under age 18 and 3.2% of those age 65 or over.

Economy
Companies headquartered in Kenilworth include Maingear, a privately held computer manufacturer specializing in custom gaming computers, desktops, custom laptops, media center computers and workstations, all of which are manufactured in the United States.

Merck & Co. announced plans in October 2013 to move its global headquarters to Kenilworth from Whitehouse Station in Readington Township, on a site that the company had previously used as a manufacturing facility, with the relocation to be completed by 2015. The campus had been used as the global headquarters for Schering-Plough, which was acquired by Merck in 2009. In April 2020, Merck announced that it would be moving its global headquarters from Kenilworth to Rahway by the end of 2023.

Arts and culture 
Since 2004, the Hudson Shakespeare Company has brought their Shakespeare in the Park programs to the Kenilworth Library known as the "Bard on the Boulevard". The Friends of the Kenilworth Library, with the assistance of a grant from the Union County Office of Cultural Affairs, sponsor these events.

Government

Local government
Kenilworth is governed under the Borough form of New Jersey municipal government, which is used in 218 municipalities (of the 564) statewide, making it the most common form of government in New Jersey. The governing body is comprised of the Mayor and the Borough Council, with all positions elected at-large on a partisan basis as part of the November general election. The Mayor is elected directly by the voters to a four-year term of office. The Borough Council is comprised of six members elected to serve three-year terms on a staggered basis, with two seats coming up for election each year in a three-year cycle. The Borough form of government used by Kenilworth is a "weak mayor / strong council" government in which council members act as the legislative body with the mayor presiding at meetings and voting only in the event of a tie. The mayor can veto ordinances subject to an override by a two-thirds majority vote of the council. The mayor makes committee and liaison assignments for council members, and most appointments are made by the mayor with the advice and consent of the council.

, the Mayor of Kenilworth is Democrat Linda Karlovitch, serving a four-year term of office ending December 31, 2023. Members of the Kenilworth Borough Council are Council President Fred Pugliese (R, 2023), Joseph Finistrella (R, 2024), William Mauro (R, 2025), Scott Pentz (R, 2023), Savino Scorese (R, 2025) and John Zimmerman Jr. (R, 2024).

In August 2020, the Borough Council appointed Louis DeMondo to fill the seat expiring in December 2021 that had been vacated the previous month following the resignation of Robert Schielke. In November 2020, Joseph Finistrella was elected to serve the balance of the term of office, defeating DeMondo.

In January 2020, the Borough Council appointed Daniel Lopez to fill the seat expiring in December 2020 that had been held by Linda Karlovitch until she resigned from her council seat to take office as mayor.

In May 2016, the Borough Council again appointed Scott Pentz, this time to fill the seat expiring in December 2016 that had been vacated by Brian Joho when he resigned from office.

In January 2016, the Borough Council appointed former councilmember Lawrence Clementi to fill the seat expiring in December 2017 that had been held by Anthony DeLuca, until he resigned from the council to take office as mayor; Clementi will serve on an interim basis until the November 2016 general election, when voters will choose a candidate to serve the balance of the term of office.

In July 2015, the Borough Council selected Scott Pentz from a list of three candidates nominated by the Republican municipal committee to fill the seat expiring in December 2016 that had been held by Barbara Macecsko, until she resigned from office the previous month. Pentz served on an interim basis until the November 2015 general election, when he lost to Democrat Kay Anne Ceceri, who was elected to serve the balance of the term of office.

Mayor Kathi Fiamingo resigned her position in April 2014 after being selected to serve as a tax court judge. Council President Scott Klinder was chosen by the Borough Council to fill Fiamingo's vacant mayoral seat and serve in that role until the November 2014 general election, when a successor would be chosen. Kevin Leary was then chosen to fill Klinder's vacant council seat. In the November 2014 general election, Republican Fred M. Pugliese won the special election for the remaining term through December 2015 of the mayoral seat, while Democrats Anthony DeLuca and Nicholas Mascaro won both of the council seats up for election for terms starting January 1, 2015. Richard LoForte was appointed to fill Pugliese's vacant council seat expiring in December 2015.

Mayors of Kenilworth

Federal, state, and county representation
Kenilworth is located in the 10th Congressional District and is part of New Jersey's 21st state legislative district.

Prior to the 2011 reapportionment following the 2010 Census, Kenilworth had been in the 20th state legislative district.

 

Union County is governed by a Board of County Commissioners, whose nine members are elected at-large to three-year terms of office on a staggered basis with three seats coming up for election each year, with an appointed County Manager overseeing the day-to-day operations of the county. At an annual reorganization meeting held in the beginning of January, the board selects a Chair and Vice Chair from among its members. , Union County's County Commissioners are 
Chair Rebecca Williams (D, Plainfield, term as commissioner and as chair ends December 31, 2022), 
Vice Chair Christopher Hudak (D, Linden, term as commissioner ends 2023; term as vice chair ends 2022),
James E. Baker Jr. (D, Rahway, 2024),
Angela R. Garretson (D, Hillside, 2023),
Sergio Granados (D, Elizabeth, 2022),
Bette Jane Kowalski (D, Cranford, 2022), 
Lourdes M. Leon (D, Elizabeth, 2023),
Alexander Mirabella (D, Fanwood, 2024) and 
Kimberly Palmieri-Mouded (D, Westfield, 2024).
Constitutional officers elected on a countywide basis are
County Clerk Joanne Rajoppi (D, Union Township, 2025),
Sheriff Peter Corvelli (D, Kenilworth, 2023) and
Surrogate Susan Dinardo (acting).
The County Manager is Edward Oatman.

Politics
As of March 2011, there were a total of 4,891 registered voters in Kenilworth, of which 1,496 (30.6% vs. 41.8% countywide) were registered as Democrats, 1,076 (22.0% vs. 15.3%) were registered as Republicans and 2,317 (47.4% vs. 42.9%) were registered as Unaffiliated. There were 2 voters registered as either Libertarians or Greens. Among the borough's 2010 Census population, 61.8% (vs. 53.3% in Union County) were registered to vote, including 79.1% of those ages 18 and over (vs. 70.6% countywide).

In the 2012 presidential election, Republican Mitt Romney received 1,775 votes (52.6% vs. 32.3% countywide), ahead of Democrat Barack Obama with 1,535 votes (45.5% vs. 66.0%) and other candidates with 39 votes (1.2% vs. 0.8%), among the 3,376 ballots cast by the borough's 5,167 registered voters, for a turnout of 65.3% (vs. 68.8% in Union County). In the 2008 presidential election, Republican John McCain received 2,064 votes (55.5% vs. 35.2% countywide), ahead of Democrat Barack Obama with 1,564 votes (42.0% vs. 63.1%) and other candidates with 54 votes (1.5% vs. 0.9%), among the 3,721 ballots cast by the borough's 5,039 registered voters, for a turnout of 73.8% (vs. 74.7% in Union County). In the 2004 presidential election, Republican George W. Bush received 1,949 votes (54.0% vs. 40.3% countywide), ahead of Democrat John Kerry with 1,589 votes (44.0% vs. 58.3%) and other candidates with 32 votes (0.9% vs. 0.7%), among the 3,608 ballots cast by the borough's 4,927 registered voters, for a turnout of 73.2% (vs. 72.3% in the whole county).

In the 2013 gubernatorial election, Republican Chris Christie received 66.2% of the vote (1,357 cast), ahead of Democrat Barbara Buono with 32.1% (657 votes), and other candidates with 1.7% (35 votes), among the 2,099 ballots cast by the borough's 5,073 registered voters (50 ballots were spoiled), for a turnout of 41.4%. In the 2009 gubernatorial election, Republican Chris Christie received 1,442 votes (59.9% vs. 41.7% countywide), ahead of Democrat Jon Corzine with 759 votes (31.5% vs. 50.6%), Independent Chris Daggett with 148 votes (6.1% vs. 5.9%) and other candidates with 25 votes (1.0% vs. 0.8%), among the 2,408 ballots cast by the borough's 4,996 registered voters, yielding a 48.2% turnout (vs. 46.5% in the county).

Education

The Kenilworth Public Schools serves students in pre-kindergarten through twelfth grade. As of the 2018–19 school year, the district, comprised of two schools, had an enrollment of 1,466 students and 126.0 classroom teachers (on an FTE basis), for a student–teacher ratio of 11.6:1. Schools in the district (with 2018–19 enrollment data from the National Center for Education Statistics) are 
Warren G. Harding Elementary School with 690 students in grades Pre-K–6 and 
David Brearley Middle School / David Brearley High School with 757 students in grades 7–12.

Students from Winfield Township attend David Brearley High School as part of a sending/receiving relationship with the Winfield Township School District.

Kenilworth is home to a Roman Catholic elementary school at St. Theresa's, which was founded in 1954 and serves students in pre-school through eighth grade through the Salesians of Don Bosco.

Transportation

Roads and highways

Kenilworth is served by two county routes, County Route 509 and County Route 617. CR 509 (Boulevard) runs west–east through the borough, connecting it to Cranford, Springfield and Westfield in one direction and Union and Roselle Park in the other. CR 617 (Michigan Avenue) runs north–south, connecting Union and U.S. Route 22 at its north end to Roselle Park and Route 28 at its south end. The Garden State Parkway cuts northeast–southwest through the town, with Interchange 138 at CR 509 serving much of the town's long-distance travelers.

Public transportation
NJ Transit provides bus service between Kenilworth and the Port Authority Bus Terminal in Midtown Manhattan in New York City and to New Jersey points, including the city of Elizabeth and nearby Union County College in Cranford. Local service is available on the 58 route, which is a direct descendant of Kenilworth's trolley route in the early 20th century.

The closest NJ Transit rail station is Roselle Park, less than a mile from the Kenilworth border and offering direct service into New York City's Penn Station on the Raritan Valley Line.
 
The Rahway Valley Railroad passed through the community but is currently out of service, the final train on the line having left the borough in April 1992. Originally established as the New York and New Orange Railroad, the line stretched  from Aldene (now known as Roselle Park) to Summit. The headquarters of the railroad were located in Kenilworth, originally in Kenilworth's Victorian-style station house until that was severely damaged in a 1974 fire, after which railroad offices were moved into a trailer and then an unused railroad club car.

Notable people 

People who were born in, residents of, or otherwise closely associated with Kenilworth include:

 Tashawn Bower (born 1995), defensive end who plays in the NFL for the Las Vegas Raiders
 Mike Chalenski (born 1970), former professional American football defensive lineman who played for six seasons in the National Football League
 Sam DeCavalcante (1912–1997), boss of the DeCavalcante crime family known as "Sam the Plumber", who used a Kenilworth plumbing supply business as his front operation
 John P. Gallagher (1932–2011), politician who served in the New Jersey Senate from the 13th Legislative District from 1982 to 1984
 Sheldon Karlin (1950–2000), distance runner who won the New York City Marathon in 1972
 Tony Siragusa (1967–2022), Indianapolis Colts and Baltimore Ravens defensive tackle, was born and raised in Kenilworth, and starred in football and wrestling for David Brearley High School

References

External links

 Kenilworth Borough website

 
1907 establishments in New Jersey
Borough form of New Jersey government
Boroughs in Union County, New Jersey
Populated places established in 1907